Heinz Fuchsbichler (born November 7, 1967) is a retired Austrian football midfielder and current manager of the AKA Vorarlberg U18.

External links
 

1967 births
Living people
Austrian footballers
Austrian football managers
DSV Leoben players
SK Vorwärts Steyr players
SKN St. Pölten players
SW Bregenz players
USV Eschen/Mauren players
Association football midfielders
SC Austria Lustenau managers
People from Voitsberg
Footballers from Styria